The 1910 Idaho gubernatorial election was held on November 8, 1910. Democratic nominee James H. Hawley  defeated incumbent Republican James H. Brady with 47.42% of the vote.

General election

Candidates
Major party candidates
James H. Hawley, Democratic
James H. Brady, Republican

Other candidates
S. W. Motley, Socialist

Results

References

1910
Idaho
Gubernatorial